The 1881 Grey Valley by-election was a by-election held on 16 June 1881 during the 7th New Zealand Parliament in the West Coast electorate of .

The by-election was caused by the resignation of the incumbent MP Edward Masters on 9 May 1881.

The by-election was won by Thomas S. Weston.

Results
The following table gives the election result:

Notes

Grey Valley 1881
1881 elections in New Zealand
June 1881 events
Grey District
Politics of the West Coast, New Zealand